Siim-Markus Post (born 13 February 1997) is an Estonian professional basketball player for KK Viimsi of the Estonian–Latvian Basketball League. He also represents the Estonian national team. Standing at 1.84 m (6 ft 0 in), he plays at the point guard position.

National team career
Post made his debut for the Estonian national team on 26 July 2020, in a 84–67 victory over Latvia.

Awards and accomplishments

Individual
 2× Estonian League Best Young Player: (2015, 2017)

References

External links
 Siim-Markus Post at fiba.com
 Siim-Markus Post at basket.ee 

1997 births
Living people
Estonian men's basketball players
Point guards
Shooting guards
Korvpalli Meistriliiga players
BC Rakvere Tarvas players
KK Pärnu players
BC Tallinn Kalev players
Sportspeople from Kohtla-Järve